is an anime and comic book series about a post-apocalyptic world.

Geist (the main character) is MD-02, a Most Dangerous Soldier, genetically engineered to function as a killing machine, but every one of the MDS units went homicidally insane. As a result, Geist was placed in suspended animation in a stasis pod orbiting the planet Jerra until it crashed several years later, awakening him and bringing him into another war on the planet.

Synopsis

M.D. Geist I: Most Dangerous Soldier
The Regular Army of the planet Jerra has been locked in a bloody civil war with the rebellious Nexrum Army, who believe that Earth should not be involved in governing its extraterrestrial colonies. In response, the Jerran Army developed the Most Dangerous Soldiers, which turned out to work too well; the MDS units attacked everyone, including their allies. One such soldier, MD-02 "Geist", was ordered placed in suspended animation aboard a stasis satellite and launched into Jerra's orbit.

After several years, Geist awakens after the stasis satellite crashes on Jerra. In a desolated city, Geist discovers a group of bandits, whose leader kills a stray soldier wearing a powered suit. Geist confronts the bandit leader over acquiring the dead soldier's suit. In a fight to the death over the suit, Geist slices off the leader's arms before impaling his combat knife through his skull. Vaiya, a female bandit, is attracted to Geist's strength, but other than her knowledge of both armies' activities, Geist shows no desire for her. The bandits spot a Jerran mobile fortress being attacked by Nexrum forces and find it as an opportunity to save the fortress for a price. Geist and the bandits form an uneasy alliance with the Jerran forces led by Colonel Krutes (Geist's former superior) before participating in a mission to stop the Jerran doomsday weapon "Death Force" from activating. Death Force's countdown commenced shortly after the president of a Jerran country was assassinated. Its purpose is to annihilate all life forms on Jerra without discrimination.

Like a black knight, Geist equips himself with the acquired powered suit (which eventually becomes his trademark), and goes into the Brain Palace with Krutes' commandos and his bandit team in tow. All but Geist and Krutes are killed during the invasion. Upon reaching Brain Palace, Geist faces an advanced combat robot activated by Krutes, realizing that the colonel set him up. While Geist battles the robot, Krutes reaches the control center to deactivate the Death Force. He succeeds, but discovers that the robot he activated has failed to kill Geist. Krutes laughs heavily before Geist crushes his skull with his hands. When Vaiya arrives at the control center, she sees Geist set off Death Force, unleashing an army of machines that consume living matter to replicate, condemning all life on Jerra to death.

M.D. Geist II: Death Force
Less than a year after Geist activated the Death Force, which decimated most of Jerra's population, he has kept himself busy by dismantling the Death Force machines one by one. The remnants of the human population have fled to a remote haven run by a warlord named Krauser. Krauser is another MDS unit, MD-01, who has a technology that hides his mobile fortress from the Death Force. When he encounters Geist, an initial fight takes place, where Krauser 'defeats' Geist, throwing him from a bridge of the fortress. Some time after, Krauser and the Jerran army plan to lure the Death Force machines into an abandoned city and detonate the lethal "Jignitz Bomb" to exterminate them.

Again, Geist's programming overrides any shred of humanity he may have, and he leads the Death Force off to Krauser's fortress, leaving Krauser's commandos to be destroyed in the Jignitz Bomb's detonation. Although most of the Death Force is consumed in the explosion as well, a large number of the machines fall upon Krauser's fortress while Geist confronts Krauser himself. Geist kills Krauser in hand-to-hand combat while the Death Force machines consume most of the refugees. Krauser is caught in an explosion and Geist's empty helmet is later shown.

M.D. Geist: Ground Zero
This comic takes place before the events of the first OVA. At a board of Regular Army officials, Lt. Leigh Wong attempts to persuade them to use Geist in battle; he is a genetically-engineered soldier bred to specialize in strategy and versatility, designed to perform as a solitary fighter, rather than within a group. Wong also mentions how Geist strictly follows feasible commands. She is dispatched to a base along with Geist, who has been instructed to work with the squad already stationed at the base, much to her frustration. The squad, led by Col. Stanton, reject Geist, viewing him as lifeless, who in turn is unaffected and assigns himself to the reserves as ordered by Stanton, much to Wong's displeasure.

Later, Stanton briefs his men on the mission they will be undertaking, in which they are to investigate and if necessary, destroy a Nexrum collective at a temple within a jungle. Wong interrupts the briefing to make mention of the Nexrum's cyborg units, to the interest of the men who have never heard of them before; her interruption is in hopes that Stanton will make use of Geist, who is the only soldier with experience against cyborgs. Suddenly, a private rushes in to tell both of them to come outside. Sgt. Robard, a soldier with whom Geist has gotten into a fight, lies twitching on the floor with both arms severed, Wong quite sinisterly sees it as proof of Geist's efficiency.

The next morning, Stanton and his men are preparing to begin their mission, only to be halted when Wong and Geist suddenly show up. Once again, Stanton refuses to accept Geist, especially after what happened yesterday, keeping him as a reserve without armor. In the jungle, Geist takes effortless care of their encounters, eventually they reach the temple to discover a Nexrum ship armed with a large cannon. Geist and the soldiers quickly occupy the base, taking the enemy forces prisoner. Wong and Stanton investigate the ship, when suddenly the soldiers are ambushed by cyborgs piloting Nexrum machines. Geist is the only one to survive, having jumped onto the ship once it has begun to take off. On board, Wong discovers a plan for the Nexrum to fire the ship's cannon at their own city, which is loaded with nuclear weapons, and it's been ordered by Earth. With no way to stop the ship, Stanton and Geist take off to destroy the engines, but before they go any further, Stanton makes it clear that Geist is to tell no one of Earth's involvement with this plan, even if Geist outlives him, he must not mention it. The two of them battle with a machine that is guarding the engines, by the end of it Stanton is fatally wounded, and his armor covered in oil leaking from the enemy machine. With his view on Geist finally re-evaluated, Stanton delivers one final order, to don his armor and take out the ship's cannon. Geist successfully does so, tangling briefly with the same machine after he discovers its connections are still active, and prepares to hijack the jet section of it. Geist escapes just in time as a defense unit destroys the reactor circuit controls in the cockpit, destroying part of the ship's thrusters, causing it to dive into the temple. Wong cries out as she sees Geist fly past, unable to save her.

The temple goes up in an enormous explosion, and a Regular Army patrol discovers Geist waiting to be picked up. Before a jury, Geist does not speak of what happened in the mission, remembering Stanton's orders. For this, Col. Krutes comes to the conclusion, based on evidence, that Geist is in some way responsible for the deaths of Regular Army personnel and for failure of the mission. Krutes expresses his wish to execute Geist, but because of President Ryan's input, he is instead to be imprisoned in stasis.

Production notes
Although Hayato Ikeda was credited as director of M.D. Geist, it was actually Ohata who did the overall direction. Because Ohata was 23 years old and inexperienced at the time, the producers brought in Ikeda for appearances. Ohata admitted that the numerous animation mistakes found on the first title were a result of a disorganized animation team. The "Director's Cut" edition, co-produced by Central Park Media, smoothed out most of the animation errors and featured additional footage - including a new introduction and epilogue.

Release
M.D. Geist was originally released in Japan by Nippon Columbia and re-released under the Denon label. In 1988, a trailer of the OVA under the title "Thunder Warrior" was produced by Gaga Communications along with a string of other anime titles the company was hoping to sell to the North American market. M.D. Geist was released in North America by Central Park Media in 1992; two years prior, the company used Geist as the logo for their mainstream anime label U.S. Manga Corps. Curiosity by fans over U.S. Manga Corps' logo boosted domestic sales of the OVA and prompted Central Park Media to collaborate with co-creator Koichi Ohata in producing a sequel. In 1996, Central Park Media released M.D. Geist - Director's Cut, featuring roughly five minutes of additional footage - including a new introduction and epilogue that paved the way for the sequel. Months later, CPM released M.D. Geist II: Death Force. In addition, the company commissioned Ohata and American artist Tim Eldred to illustrate the comic book adaptation.

In the United States, the Sci Fi Channel premiered M.D. Geist I and II during their Ani-Monday block at midnight E.S.T. September 29 and October 6, 2008 respectively. Following the closure of Central Park Media, M.D. Geist was re-licensed by ADV Films and was re-released on DVD in July 2009. It is currently available for digital download on iTunes by Manga Entertainment, along with Now and Then, Here and There.

Adaptations
To coincide with the release of M.D. Geist I: Most Dangerous Soldier (Director's Cut) and M.D. Geist II: Death Force, CPM Manga released a comic book adaptation written and drawn by Tim Eldred with Ohata as guest artist. This comic was preceded by Ground Zero, and served as a more refined version of the original 1986 OVA, in which several details were explained better to make up for some of the plot holes present in the original version. Nexrum is also known as "Negstrom" in the comics, and Krutes' name goes by the original Japanese romanization of "Kurtz".

Reception
Darius Washington from Otaku USA magazine defined the original version of M.D. Geist as "an entertaining action vid with okay production values, unique elements and a psychotically fun twist" The owner of Central Park Media John O'Donnell jokingly named it "the best bad anime ever made".

References

External links

1986 anime OVAs
1996 anime films
ADV Films
Adventure anime and manga
Central Park Media
Mecha anime and manga
Post-apocalyptic anime and manga
Single OVAs
Japanese animated science fiction films
Animated adventure films
1980s science fiction films
1990s science fiction films